Catalan Unity is a regionalist party based in southern France. It represents the Catalan minority in Northern Catalonia.

The party supports Northern Catalonia getting its own autonomous region in France.

References

External links
 

Political parties in Catalonia